Tristan Benjamin (born 1 April 1957) is an English former footballer who played the majority of his career in defence for Notts County.

Benjamin joined County as an apprentice and signed professional for them in March 1975. He made 311 league appearances for County, before moving to Chesterfield at the end of the 1987 season.

After a season at Chesterfield he moved on again playing semi-professional football for Shepshed Charterhouse, Corby Town and Sutton Town.

References

1957 births
Living people
People from Saint Kitts
English footballers
Association football defenders
Notts County F.C. players
Chesterfield F.C. players
Shepshed Dynamo F.C. players
Corby Town F.C. players
Ashfield United F.C. players
English Football League players
Black British sportspeople
Saint Kitts and Nevis emigrants to the United Kingdom